Jürg Häusermann (born 1951) is a Swiss-German media scholar and emeritus professor. He studied Germanic, Russian language and literature and French linguistics at the University of Zurich and the Moscow State Linguistic University. Häusermann doctorate in 1977 in Zurich. 1985 to 1989 he was visiting professor at the University of Trieste in Italy. From 1993 to 2017, Häusermann was professor of media analysis and production at the University of Tübingen. He was director of the German seminar at Tübingen.

Works
Journalistisches Texten. 3rd edition. Konstanz: UVK, 2011. 
 Radio. Tübingen: Niemeyer, 1998.

External links

http://www.rhet.de/

1951 births
Living people
People from Winterthur
Linguists from Switzerland
Swiss mass media scholars
Academic staff of the University of Trieste
Academic staff of the University of Tübingen
University of Zurich alumni